The 243 Winchester Super Short Magnum or 243 WSSM is a rifle cartridge introduced in 2003. It uses a .300 WSM (Winchester Short Magnum) case shortened and necked down to accept a .243in/6mm diameter bullet, and is a high velocity round based on ballistics design philosophies that are intended to produce a high level of efficiency. The correct name for the cartridge, as listed by the Sporting Arms and Ammunition Manufacturers' Institute (SAAMI), is 243 WSSM, without a decimal point.  Winchester has discontinued the manufacture of 243 WSSM ammunition.
As of the first half of 2016, Winchester/Olin did manufacture and release for sale some WSSM ammunition.  The product is only manufactured periodically, often at inconsistent intervals.

Design
The 243 WSSM is an addition to the Winchester Super Short Magnum (WSSM) family of cartridges, which also include the .223 WSSM and the .25 WSSM, and the idea behind the 243 WSSM was to develop a compact, higher velocity version of the well-established and internationally popular .243 Winchester unveiled by Winchester in 1955.  The 243 WSSM was first introduced in 2003.

The 243 WSSM's case is unusually short and fat in profile, contrasting markedly with most other rifle cartridges, and is intended to take advantage of what ballisticians have shown is the more uniform and efficient burning of propellant powder when it is held in a short, fat stack by the cartridge case.

Performance
The percentage gain in performance over the older .243 Winchester is around 10% or less.

This cartridge is usually used for small game such as varminting, and used for animals as large as deer.

Advantages
Compared to other factory 6mm sporting cartridges the 243 WSSM is capable of functioning in the AR-15. Other factory produced 6mm cartridges like the 243 Win and 6mm Rem are both too long for the AR-15 and require the AR-10 platform.

The 243 WSSM is  shorter than the 243 Win, giving the 243 WSSM the ability to fit in a super-short action rifle. Thus 243 WSSM rifles can be lighter, have stiffer actions and have faster actions to cycle.

The 243 WSSM gives generally a 10% increase in velocity over the 243 Win.

See also
 List of rifle cartridges
 Table of handgun and rifle cartridges

References

 Cartridge Dimensions at Steves Pages

External links
243 WSSM – The Long-Awaited 6 mm "Answer"? By Bill Prudden
The 243 WSSM by Chuck Hawks
The Experts Agree The WSSMs are Winners! Browning
The 243 WSSM at Guns & Ammo
Hunting experiences with the 243 WSSM 243WSSM.com

Pistol and rifle cartridges
Winchester Super Short Magnum rifle cartridges